Massachusetts Bay is either

 Massachusetts Bay, a bay on the Gulf of Maine that forms part of the central coastline of the Commonwealth of Massachusetts, which is one of the states in the United States of America;
 Massachusetts Bay Colony, one of the thirteen colonies that ultimately became the United States of America;
 The Commonwealth of Massachusetts according to a former name used officially until 1781, and used in the Declaration of Independence, the Articles of Confederation, the Constitution of the United States, and the Definitive Treaty of Peace of 1783 between Britain and the United States.